Repass is a surname. Notable people with this surname include:

Bob Repass (1917–2006), American baseball player
Rex Repass, American market researcher
Wendy Repass, American folk singer-songwriter